GRB 000131 was a gamma-ray burst (GRB) that was detected on 31 January 2000 at 14:59 UTC. A gamma-ray burst is a highly luminous flash associated with an explosion in a distant galaxy and producing gamma rays, the most energetic form of electromagnetic radiation, and often followed by a longer-lived "afterglow" emitted at longer wavelengths (X-ray, ultraviolet, optical, infrared, and radio).

Observations
GRB 000131 was detected on 31 January 2000 at 14:59 UTC by Ulysses, KONUS, NEAR Shoemaker, and BATSE. It lasted approximately 90 seconds. On 4 February 2000, optical observations of the region were made by telescopes at Paranal Observatory and La Silla Observatory in Chile which revealed the burst's optical afterglow.

Distance record
GRB 000131 had a redshift of approximately z = 4.5. This corresponds to a distance of about 11 billion light years, making it the most distant gamma-ray burst that had ever been recorded up to that date. This distance record was broken by GRB 050904, which had a redshift of z = 6.29.

Optical emission
GRB 000131 was the first gamma-ray burst to have its optical afterglow detected by an 8-meter telescope. At the time of its discovery, GRB 000131 was the most distant burst ever detected. However, it was not the most energetic: assuming isotropic emission, the total energy output of the burst was approximately 1054 ergs, placing it in second behind GRB 990123. Furthermore, the gamma-ray data also suggested that the burst was beamed rather than isotropic, a characteristic which would further decrease the total energy output. This demonstrated the importance of the use of optical telescopes in the studies of gamma-ray bursts.

References

000131
20000131
January 2000 events